The 1988 King Cup was the 30th season of the knockout competition since its establishment in 1956. Al-Nassr were the defending champions but they were eliminated by eventual champions Al-Ittihad in the semi-finals.

Al-Ittihad won their 6th title after defeating Al-Ettifaq 1–0 in the final. This was the first final to be held in the King Fahd International Stadium. As winners of the tournament, Al-Ittihad qualified for the 1989 Arab Cup Winners' Cup.

Round of 16
Both Al-Ettifaq and Ohod received a bye to the next round. Al-Ettifaq received due to their participation in the 1988 Gulf Club Champions Cup. Ohod received a bye to the lack of teams participating in this round. The matches of the Round of 16 were held on 31 March and 1 April 1988.

Quarter-finals
The matches of the Quarter-finals were held on 7 and 8 April 1988.

Semi-finals
The four winners of the quarter-finals progressed to the semi-finals. The semi-finals were played on 12 April 1988. All times are local, AST (UTC+3).

Final
The final was played between Al-Ittihad and Al-Ettifaq in the King Fahd Stadium in Riyadh. Al-Ittihad were appearing in their 11th final while Al-Ettifaq were making their 6th appearance.

Top goalscorers

References

1988
Saudi Arabia
Cup